Larry Black  (born December 1, 1989) is an American football coach who is currently the defensive tackles coach at Vanderbilt. He was previously the defensive line coach for Toledo.

Professional career

Cincinnati Bengals
Black signed with Cincinnati as college free agent on April 30, 2013. On July 31, Black suffered a leg fracture and dislocated ankle in practice. He was waived (injured) on Aug. 7, and after being cleared he was reverted to the Bengals Reserve/Injured list. The Bengals waived Black on August 25, 2014.

References

External links
 https://web.archive.org/web/20140325083553/http://www.iuhoosiers.com/sports/m-footbl/mtt/blackjr_larry00.html
 http://www.bengals.com/team/roster/Larry-Black/f3df2d6e-e09d-400b-83bc-78b708bb4ad5

1989 births
Living people
American football defensive tackles
Indiana Hoosiers football players
Cincinnati Bengals players
Players of American football from Cincinnati
Carthage Firebirds football coaches
Toledo Rockets football coaches